The Pauschikushish River Ewiwach is a tributary of Dana Lake (Eeyou Istchee Baie-James) in Regional County Municipality (RCM) of Eeyou Istchee Baie-James (municipality), in the administrative region of Nord-du-Québec, in the Canadian province of Quebec, in Canada.

The surface of the river is usually frozen from early November to mid-May, however, safe ice circulation is generally from mid-November to mid-April.

Geography 
The main hydrographic slopes near the “Pauschikushish Ewiwach River” are:
North side: Dana Lake (Eeyou Istchee Baie-James), Du Tast Lake;
East side: Enistustikweyach River, Evans Lake, Broadback River;
South side: Muskiki River, Nottaway River, Soscumica Lake;
West side: Dusaux Lake, Nottaway River, Davoust River.

The “Pauschikushish Ewiwach River” has its source of a stream surrounded by marsh and located at:

 south-west of Lake Ouagama;
 south of Evans Lake;
 south-east of the mouth of the “Pauschikushish Ewiwach River”;
 southeast of the mouth of Dana Lake (Eeyou Istchee Baie-James);
 north of downtown Matagami.

From its source, the "Pauschikushish Ewiwach River" flows over  according to the following segments:

Upper course of the' Pauschikushish Ewiwach River  (segment of )

 easterly to a creek (coming from the northeast);
 westerly passing the north side of a mountain whose summit reaches , to the Iskaskunikaw River (coming from the South);
 northwesterly to the northeast of Kakusikuch Hill to Kakuskwapiminakuch Creek (coming from the south);
 north across the Amikanan Rapids, then forming a hook to the east, to the confluence of the Matawawaskweyau River (coming from the west);

Lower section of the' Pauschikushish Ewiwach River  (segment of )

 northeasterly in a marsh zone to Kapisaukanwe Creek (from the southeast);
 northeasterly in a marsh zone to Matawawskweyasi Creek (from the northwest);
 easterly forming a hook to the south to Mitapeschiskau Creek (coming from the northeast);
 north to the mouth of the river.

The "Pauschikushish Ewiwach River" flows into a bay on the south shore of [Dana Lake (Eeyou Istchee Baie-James)] where the current flows north and east, where it flows into a bay west of Evans Lake.

The mouth of the "Pauschikushish Ewiwach River" is located at:
 south-west of the mouth of Dana Lake (Eeyou Istchee Baie-James);
 Southwest of the mouth of Evans Lake
 north of Lake Soscumica;
 south-east of the mouth of the Broadback River;
North of downtown Matagami.

Toponymy 
Of Cree origin, the toponym "Pauschikushish Ewiwach River" means: "the river flowing from the small rapids".

The toponym "Pauschikushish Ewiwach River" was formalized on December 5, 1968, at the Commission de toponymie du Québec

References

See also 
James Bay
Rupert Bay
Broadback River, a watercourse
Evans Lake, a body of water
Dana Lake (Eeyou Istchee Baie-James), a body of water
Matawawaskweyau River, a watercourse
Kakaskutatakuch River, a watercourse
Iskaskunikaw River, a watercourse
List of rivers of Quebec

Rivers of Nord-du-Québec
Broadback River drainage basin
Eeyou Istchee James Bay